A marriage of convenience  is a marriage contracted for reasons other than that of love and commitment. Instead, such a marriage is entered into for personal gain, or some other sort of strategic purpose, such as a political marriage. There are some cases in which those married do not intend to live together as a couple, and typically got married only for one of them to gain the right to reside in a country, meaning a marriage of benefit. 

A marriage of convenience that is neither a sham marriage entered into for fraudulent purposes nor a forced marriage, is not against the law.

In many cultures, it is usual for parents to decide their adult children's marriages; this is called an arranged marriage.

Legal loophole

Marriages of convenience are often contracted to exploit legal loopholes of various sorts. A couple may wed for one of them to gain citizenship or right of abode, for example, as many countries around the world will grant such rights to anyone married to a resident citizen. In the United States, this practice is known as a green card marriage. In Australia, there have been marriages of convenience to bring attention to the government's Youth Allowance laws. On 31 March 2010 two students were publicly and legally married on the University of Adelaide's lawn so that they could both receive full Youth Allowance.
In the United States during the era of the Vietnam War, some couples were wed during the man's time of exposure to the military draft; the couple agreed to no contact, followed by an annulment at the end of the (typically one year) marriage. Advertisements were commonly placed in student newspapers to this effect.
Because they exploit legal loopholes, sham marriages of convenience often have legal consequences. For example, U.S. Immigration (USCIS) can punish this with a US$250,000 fine and five-year prison sentence.

Homosexuality
Another common reason for marriages of convenience is to hide one partner's homosexuality in places where being openly gay is punishable or potentially detrimental. A sham marriage of this type, sometimes called a lavender marriage, is usually performed to keep the appearance of heterosexuality to prevent negative consequences of LGBT discrimination. Such marriages may have one heterosexual and one gay partner, or two gay partners: a lesbian and a gay man married to each other. In the case where a gay man marries a woman, the woman is sometimes said to be his "beard", while in the case where a lesbian marries a man, the man is sometimes said to be her "merkin".

Metaphorical usage
The phrase "marriage of convenience" has also been generalized to mean any partnership between groups or individuals for their mutual (and sometimes illegitimate) benefit, or between groups or individuals otherwise unsuited to working together. An example would be a "national unity government", as existed in Israel during much of the 1980s or in the United Kingdom during World War II. More specifically, cohabitation refers to a political situation which can occur in countries with a semi-presidential system (especially France), where the president and the prime minister belong to opposed political camps.

Political marriage

Marriages of convenience, often termed marriages of state, have always been commonplace in royal, aristocratic, and otherwise powerful families, to make alliances between two powerful houses. Examples include the marriages of Agnes of Courtenay, her daughter Sibylla, Jeanne d'Albret, and Catherine of Aragon.

See also 
 Abuse
 Basic Allowance for Housing
 Child abuse
 Child neglect
 Child marriage
 Forced marriage
 Lavender marriage
 Marriage of state
 Arranged marriage

References

Further reading 
 Jones, James A., "The Immigration Marriage Fraud Amendments: Sham Marriages or Sham Legislation?", Florida State University Law Review, 1997
 Seminara, David, "Hello, I Love You, Won’t You Tell Me Your Name: Inside the Green Card Marriage Phenomenon", Center for Immigration Studies, Washington, D.C., November 2008
 Winston, Ali, "Marrying For Love?: You'll Have To Prove It", City Limits News, New York, Monday, Jul 28, 2008
 Winter, Jana, "EXCLUSIVE: Aide to Harry Reid Lied to Feds, Submitted False Documents About Sham Marriage", Fox News, October 25, 2010
 Academic article on political discourse & policies on forced and fraudulent marriages in the Netherlands: Bonjour&De Hart 2013, "A proper wife, a proper marriage. Constructions of 'us' and 'them' in Dutch family migration policy", European Journal of Women's Studies 
Hill, S. "The European Economic Area and Marriages of Convenience", Thomas Bingham Chambers, London, Thursday, April 2, 2015
 Eli Coleman PhD (1989) The Married Lesbian, Marriage & Family Review, 14:3-4, 119-135, DOI: 10.1300/J002v14n03_06

External links

Family law
Types of marriage